The Temple of Portunus or Temple of Fortuna Virilis ("manly fortune") is a Roman temple in Rome, Italy, one of the best preserved of all Roman temples.  Its dedication remains unclear, as ancient sources mention several temples in this area of Rome, without saying enough to make it clear which this is. It was called the Temple of Fortuna Virilis from the Renaissance, and remains better known by this name. If dedicated to Portunus, the god of keys, doors and livestock, and so granaries, it is the main temple dedicated to the god in the city.

Architecture

It is in the Ionic order and is by the ancient Forum Boarium by the Tiber, during Antiquity the site overlooked the Port Tiberinus at a sharp bend in the river; from here, Portunus watched over cattle barges as they entered the city from Ostia.

The temple was originally built in the 3rd or 4th century BC but was rebuilt between 120–80 BC, the rectangular building consists of a tetrastyle portico and cella, raised on a high podium reached by a flight of steps, which it retains. Like the Maison Carrée in Nîmes, it has a pronaos portico of four Ionic columns across and two columns deep. The columns of the portico are free-standing, while the remaining five columns on the long sides and the four columns at the rear are half-columns engaged along the walls of the cella. This form is sometimes called pseudoperipteral, as distinct from a true peripteral temple like the Parthenon entirely surrounded by free-standing columns. The Ionic capitals are of the original form, different in the frontal and side views, except in the volutes at the corners, which project at 45°, a common Roman detail. It is built of tuff and travertine with a stucco surface.

If still in use by the 4th-century, the temple would have been closed during the persecution of pagans in the late Roman Empire. The temple owes its state of preservation to its being converted for use as a church in 872 and rededicated to Santa Maria Egiziaca (Saint Mary of Egypt). Its Ionic order has been much admired, drawn and engraved and copied since the 16th century. The original coating of stucco over its tufa and travertine construction has been lost.

The circular Temple of Hercules Victor is south-east of the temple in the Forum Boarium.

The 18th century Temple of Harmony in Somerset, England is a folly based on the Temple of Portunus.

See also

List of ancient monuments in Rome
List of Ancient Roman temples

References

External links

Temple of Portune
Mary Ann Sullivan, "Temple of Fortuna Virilis (Temple of Portunus)"
Images of Temple of Fortuna Virilis (or Portunus)
Description in the site of the "Soprintendenza Speciale per il Colosseo, il MNR e l'Area Archeologica di Roma"
High-resolution 360° Panoramas and Images of Temple of Portunus | Art Atlas

Portunus
Portunus
Rome R. XII Ripa
1st-century BC religious buildings and structures
Buildings and structures completed in the 1st century BC
Conversion of non-Christian religious buildings and structures into churches
Deconsecrated Roman Catholic churches in Rome